St Ita's may refer to:

 St. Ita's Hospital, a large mental hospital near Dublin
 St. Ita's GAA, a Gaelic games club in County Cork, Ireland
 St. Ita's Church, a Catholic church in Chicago

See also
 Saint Ita, an Irish saint